{{Speciesbox
| image = Repomucenus richardsonii.jpg
| taxon = Callionymus curvicornis| authority = Valenciennes, 1837
| synonyms = *Repomucenus curvicornis (Valenciennes, 1837) Callionymus punctatus Richardson, 1837 Callionymus richardsonii Bleeker, 1854 Repomucenus richardsonii (Bleeker, 1854) 
}}Callionymus curvicornis'', the horn dragonet, is a species of dragonet native to the northwestern Pacific Ocean.  This species grows to a length of  SL.

References 

C
Fish described in 1837